Tatlar may refer to:
Tat people (Caucasus)
Tat people (Iran)
Tats, a sub-ethnic group of the Crimean Tatars; see Crimean Tatars#Sub-ethnic groups
Tatlar, Agdash, Azerbaijan
Tatlar, Kalbajar, Azerbaijan